Ilhom Mo'minjonov, also spelt Ilkhom Muminjonov (born 21 January 1979 in Tashkent) is a former Uzbek footballer.

Club career
He scored three goals en route to a 3–2 Uzbek cup final defeat to Pakhtakor in 2004 where he came on at half-time. In 2007, he was awarded the Uzbek League Top Scorer award with 21 goals; 5 for Lokomotiv Tashkent and the remaining 16 for Kuruvchi (renamed Bunyodkor in 2008) who purchased him during the season. Mo'minjonov scored 102 goals in Uzbek League and Uzbek Cup matches, entering the Gennadi Krasnitsky club.

Managing career
He retired from football in 2009, and is now working within the Bunyodkor academy.. In 2011, he became head coach of Tashkent football club NBU Osiyo in First League.

On 24 July 2012, Mo'minjonov left NBU Osiyo and became a new head coach of Pakhtakor-2 Chilanzar. In January 2014 Mo'minjonov was appointed as head coach for Pakhtakor Youth team which plays in Uzbek Youth League. On 6 November 2016 he was named as head coach of Navbahor Namangan replacing Ravshan Bozorov at this position.

National team
He has represented Uzbekistan three times, all substitute appearances. His first two caps came in 2001, after a fine season with Traktor Tashkent where he scored 18 times. He gained his last cap in 2007.

Honours

Club
Uzbek League runner-up: 2007

Individual
Uzbek League Top Scorer: 2007 (21 goals)

References

External links

1979 births
Living people
Uzbekistani footballers
Association football forwards
Uzbekistan international footballers
Navbahor Namangan players
Sportspeople from Tashkent
FC Bunyodkor players
Footballers at the 2002 Asian Games
Asian Games competitors for Uzbekistan